I'm Your Playmate is an album by R&B singer Suave, released in 1988.

Track listing

References

1988 albums